Yeserlu (also Romanized as Yeserlū and Yesreloo; also known as Yassarli) is a village in Chah Dasht Rural District, Shara District, Hamadan County, Hamadan Province, Iran. At the 2006 census, its population was 1,172, in 231 families.

References 

Populated places in Hamadan County